

Legend

List

References

External links
 The Year Of The RPG? at GameInformer
The Best Role-Playing Games of 2012 at IGN

2012-13